Russula vinosa, commonly known in English as the darkening brittlegill, is a species of basidiomycete mushroom found in coniferous woodlands in Europe and North America in summer and early autumn. Unlike many red-capped members of the russula genus, it is edible and mild-tasting. It is usually understood to have a symbiotic relationship with evergreen tree roots, except for in mountainous areas where it has occasionally associated with birches.

Taxonomy 
Russula vinosa was originally described in the Swedish guide "Svampbok", (lit. "Mushroom Book"), written by Dr. M. A. Lindblad for publication in 1901. Romel who came up with the synonymous Russula obscura was an editor for the 1913 release of the text. The specific epithet "vinosa" is derived from the Latin vinum "wine", likely alluding to the wine-colored cap of this species that is capable of acting as a dye.

Description 
The cap is concave and wine to red-brown in colour, often fading to a pale white or tan in the center with age. The widely spaced gills are white, and adnexed or free. The stipe is cylindrical and white or cream colored. The brittle flesh is light and the taste is mild.

Similar species
The red-capped color of Russula vinosa is almost impossible to visually separate from other toxic and inedible red-capped Russulas, such as the bloody brittlegill (R. sanguinaria), the sickener (R. emetica), and the beechwood sickener (R. nobilis). It may also be confused with similar edible species such as Russula paludosa and Russula decolorans. It is therefore important to identify the mushroom with absolute certainty before consumption.

Distribution and habitat 
Russula vinosa is found in Europe and North America. It is known from Great Britain, Southern Europe, New England, and Fennoscandia. It usually occurs in coniferous tree stands in summer and early autumn.

Edibility 
Unlike many other red-capped members of the genus, Russula vinosa is mild-tasting and edible. In Sweden where its edibility is noted, it is known as "Vinkremla" alluding to its wine color.

See also 
List of Russula species

References

External links 

vinosa
Fungi described in 1901
Fungi of Europe
Fungi of North America
Edible fungi